The following table lists almost every attraction, defunct and present, within NBCUniversal's Universal Destinations & Experiences around the world. Some of the ticks feature links to appropriate Wikipedia pages.

Notes 
 Universal's Great Movie Escape is an escape room attraction nearby Universal's Orlando theme parks, in Universal CityWalk Orlando

See also
 List of lands at Universal theme parks
 List of properties at Universal Destinations & Experiences

References

Universal Parks & Resorts lists